Sermur is a commune in the Creuse department in the Nouvelle-Aquitaine region in central France.

Geography

Population

Sights
 The church, dating from the nineteenth century.
 The ruined tower, the only remains of an eleventh-century castle.

See also
Communes of the Creuse department

References

Communes of Creuse